Brovst is a town in North Jutland, Denmark. It is located in Jammerbugt Municipality, 16 km east of Fjerritslev, 14 km southwest of Aabybro and 2 km east and northeast of the villages of Ny Skovsgård and Skovsgård.

Until 1 January 2007 Brovst was the seat of the former Brovst Municipality.

History
Brovst is first mentioned in 1458 as Brosth.

A train station was built in Brovst in 1897, and Brovst was a stop on the Fjerritslev-Nørresundby railroad throughout the railroad's history. When the railroad was shut down in 1969, Brovst Station was also closed.

Notable residents 
 Hans Nielsen (born 1959), speedway rider
 Ane Halsboe-Jørgensen (born 1983), politician and member of the Folketing
 Nicolaj Ritter (born 1992), football player

References

Cities and towns in the North Jutland Region
Jammerbugt Municipality